The Embassy of Australia in Washington, D.C. is the diplomatic mission of the Commonwealth of Australia to the United States. The chancery is temporarily located in the National Geographic Building at 1145 17th Street NW. This temporary location will serve as the embassy for the next three years while the one on Scott Circle is demolished to make way for a brand new chancery to be unveiled in 2022.

The current ambassador of Australia to the United States is Arthur Sinodinos, Australian diplomat and former politician,  who succeeded
Joe Hockey in 2020. He resides at the Australian ambassador's residence located at 3120 Cleveland Avenue, NW. The current Deputy Head of Mission is Paul Myler. In addition to the embassy, Australian consulates are located in New York City, Chicago, Honolulu, Los Angeles, and San Francisco.

Chancery

The chancery has featured Australian wine tastings, exhibitions of ceramics by Gwyn Hanssen Pigott, sketches of World War II soldiers by Louis Kahan, paintings of Aboriginal women, and paintings of the Outback by Ben Shearer. A gallery located inside the embassy is open from 10am until 2pm on weekdays.

In January 2015 it was reported that the chancery's condition was deteriorating, and that scaffolding and cladding had been erected to prevent parts of the façade from injuring people if they dislodged from the building. At this time the Government was considering options to repair it. A decision was made in 2015 to demolish the chancery and replace it with a new building at a cost of $A236.9 million. Work on the project is scheduled to commence in 2019 with the building being completed in late 2021.

Bakers Creek Memorial

Previously located behind the chancery building was a memorial to the World War II United States Army soldiers who died during the Bakers Creek air crash, the deadliest air disaster in Australian history. Because host countries typically exercise limited jurisdiction over embassies, the Bakers Creek Memorial Association petitioned American politicians to relocate the memorial to Arlington National Cemetery.

Senators Arlen Specter and Bob Casey, Jr. of Pennsylvania inserted language into the 2008 defense authorization bill to relocate the memorial.
On June 11, 2009, a dedication ceremony took place at the memorial's new home in Fort Myer, Virginia, near the Selfridge Gate to Arlington National Cemetery.

See also
 Australia–United States relations
 List of ambassadors of Australia to the United States
 List of Consuls-General of Australia in New York
 Embassy of the United States, Canberra
 List of ambassadors of the United States to Australia
 List of diplomatic missions in the United States
 List of diplomatic missions in Washington, D.C.
 List of diplomatic missions of Australia

References

External links

Official website
2011 ANZAC Lecture

Government buildings completed in 1969
Australia
Washington, D.C.
Modernist architecture in Washington, D.C.
Office buildings in Washington, D.C.
Australia–United States relations
Australia
Buildings and structures demolished in 2020
Demolished buildings and structures in Washington, D.C.